The 1916–17 LSU Tigers basketball team represents Louisiana State University during the 1916–17 college men's basketball season. The coach was C. C. Stroud.

References

LSU Tigers basketball seasons